The following is a timeline of the COVID-19 pandemic in Nigeria from February to June 2020.

Timeline

February

27 February – Nigeria confirmed its first case in Lagos State, an Italian citizen who works in Nigeria had returned on 25 February from Milan, Italy through the Murtala Muhammed International Airport, fell ill on 26 February and was transferred to Lagos State biosecurity facilities for isolation and testing.

March

1 March – four Chinese citizens were quarantined in Plateau State, they all tested negative the following day.

3 March – the governor of Lagos State, Babajide Sanwo-Olu disclosed that two foreign Nationals from an unnamed Asian country has tested negative to the virus.

6 March  
The Nigeria Centre for Disease Control reported that a total of 219 primary and secondary contacts of the index case had been identified and were being actively monitored.
Anambra State government announced that five Chinese citizens tested negative for the virus.

9 March 
A second case was confirmed, a Nigerian citizen in Ewekoro, Ogun State who had contact with the first case.
The President Muhammadu Buhari established a Presidential Task Force for the control of the virus in the country.

10 March – Turkish Airlines cancelled all their flights to Nigeria due to the virus outbreak.

13 March – Nigeria confirmed that the second case no longer had the virus in his system and thus tested negative.

15 March – A woman in Enugu State displayed the symptoms of coronavirus, she tested negative the following day.

17 March 
Nigeria confirmed the third case in Lagos State, A 30-year-old Nigerian female citizen that returned on 13 March from the United Kingdom.
The 20th National Sports Festival that was supposed to hold in Benin City, Edo State from 22 March to 1 April, was postponed.

18 March 
5 cases reported: 4 in Lagos State and 1 in Ekiti State.
The management of the National Youth Service Corps suspended the 2020 Batch A stream one 21 days orientation exercise indefinitely. The orientation exercise commenced on 10 March and was expected to end on 30 March, before it was suspended after just 8 days.
Nigeria placed a travel ban on 13 countries with high cases of the virus; United States, United Kingdom, South Korea, Switzerland, Germany, France, Italy, China, Spain, Netherlands, Norway, Japan and Iran.

19 March
4 cases reported in Lagos State. 
The Nigerian government also announced that the first confirmed case tested negative and was discharged the following day.
The Federal government announced the closure of tertiary institutions, secondary and primary schools.

20 March 
Nigeria extended their travel ban to two more countries, Sweden and Austria.
Nigeria announced the closure of their international airports, Enugu, Port Harcourt and Kano airports from 21 March.

21 March 
10 cases reported: 7 in Lagos State and 3 in the FCT.
The Nigerian Railway Corporation also announced the suspension of all passenger services from 23 March.
Nigeria announced the closure of the remaining two international airports, Abuja and Lagos, from 23 March.

22 March – 8 cases reported: 6 in Lagos State, 1 in Oyo State and 1 in the FCT.

23 March 
10 cases reported: 6 in Lagos State, 3 in the FCT and 1 in Edo State. 
The first death was also confirmed, a 67-year-old Suleiman Achimugu, an engineer and former managing director of Pipelines and products Marketing Company, who returned from United Kingdom with underlying health conditions.

24 March – 4 cases reported: 1 in Lagos State, 1 in Ogun State, 1 in Bauchi State and 1 in the FCT.

25 March – 7 cases reported: 3 in Lagos State, 1 in Osun State, 1 in Rivers State and 2 in the FCT.

26 March 
14 cases reported: 12 in Lagos State, 1 in Bauchi State and 1 in the FCT. 
Nigeria announced that they were tracing 4,370 suspected cases of the virus.

27 March  
16 cases reported: 8 in Lagos State, 3 in the FCT, 2 in Enugu State, 2 in Oyo State and 1 in Edo State. 
Lagos State governor, Babajide Sanwo-Olu announced that the local governments with the highest number of cases are Eti-Osa and Ikeja.

28 March – 16 cases reported: 7 in Lagos State, 4 in Oyo State, 2 in the FCT, 1 in Osun State, 1 in Kaduna State and 1 in Benue State.

29 March – 14 cases reported: 9 in Lagos State and 5 in the FCT.

30 March
20 cases reported: 13 in Lagos State, 4 in the FCT, 2 in Kaduna State and 1 in Oyo State. 
5 persons were discharged with 1 death. 
The suspected cases that Nigeria were tracing, rose to 6,000.

31 March – 8 cases reported, bringing the total number of confirmed cases to 139.

April

1 April – 35 cases reported: 9 in Osun State, 9 in Lagos State, 7 in the FCT, 5 in Akwa Ibom State, 2 in Edo State, 1 in Ekiti State, 1 in Kaduna State and 1 in Bauchi State.

2 April
10 cases reported: 7 in Lagos State and 3 in the FCT. 
It was also announced that 11 persons have been discharged.

3 April
25 cases reported: 11 in Lagos State, 6 in Osun State, 3 in the FCT, 3 in Edo State, 1 in Ondo State and 1 in Oyo State. 
It was also announced that 5 persons have been discharged with 2 deaths. 
Nigeria announced that they have identified about 6,700 contacts and followed up on about 71%, testing about 4,000 people and possessing a total of 8 testing labs.

4 April, 5 cases reported: 3 in Bauchi State and 2 in the FCT.

5 April – 18 cases reported: 11 in Lagos State, 4 in the FCT, 2 in Edo State and 1 in Kaduna State.

6 April – 6 cases reported: 2 in Kwara State, 2 in Edo State, 1 in Rivers State and 1 in the FCT.

7 April – 16 cases reported: 10 in Lagos State, 2 in the FCT, 2 in Oyo State, 1 in Delta State and 1 in Katsina State.

8 April – 22 cases reported: 15 in Lagos State, 4 in the FCT, 2 in Bauchi State and 1 in Edo State.

9 April – 14 cases reported: 13 in Lagos State and 1 in Delta State.

10 April  
17 cases reported: 8 in Lagos State, 3 in Katsina State, 2 in the FCT, 1 in Niger State, 1 in Kaduna State, 1 in Ondo State and 1 in Anambra State. 
Nigeria announced that they have identified about 8,932 people of interest and monitoring 220.

11 April – 13 cases reported: 11 in Lagos State, 1 in Delta State and 1 in Kano State.

12 April – 5 cases reported: 2 in Lagos State, 2 in Kwara State and 1 in Katsina State.

13 April
20 cases reported: 13 in Lagos State, 2 in Edo State, 2 in Kano State, 2 in Ogun State and 1 in Ondo State. 
Nigeria announced that they have increased testing by 50%, to the current capacity of 1,500 tests per day, testing about 6,000 people and possessing a total of 11 testing labs.

14 April
30 cases reported: 25 in Lagos State, 2 in the FCT, 1 in Kano State, 1 in Akwa Ibom State and 1 in Edo State. 
Lagos State government announced that their officials visited 118,000 households in two days, identifying 119 persons with the symptoms of the virus in the state.

15 April 
34 cases reported: 18 in Lagos State, 12 in Kano State, 2 in Katsina State, 1 in Delta State and 1 in Niger State. 
Nigeria announced that they upgraded to the capacity of testing 3,000 persons per day.

16 April – 35 cases and 1 death reported, bringing the total number of confirmed cases and deaths to 442 and 13, respectively.

17 April – 51 cases and 4 deaths reported, bringing the total number of confirmed cases and deaths to 493 and 17, respectively.

18 April – 48 cases and 2 deaths reported, bringing the total number of confirmed cases and deaths to 541 and 19, respectively.

19 April – 86 cases and 2 deaths reported, bringing the total number of confirmed cases and deaths to 627 and 21, respectively.

20 April – 38 cases and 1 death reported, bringing the total number of confirmed cases and deaths to 665 and 22, respectively.

21 April – 117 cases and 3 deaths reported, bringing the total number of confirmed cases and deaths to 782 and 25, respectively.

22 April – 91 cases and 3 deaths reported, bringing the total number of confirmed cases and deaths to 873 and 28, respectively.

23 April – 108 cases and 3 deaths reported, bringing the total number of confirmed cases and deaths to 981 and 31, respectively.

24 April – 114 cases and 1 death reported, bringing the total number of confirmed cases and deaths to 1,095 and 32, respectively.

25 April – 87 cases and 3 deaths reported, bringing the total number of confirmed cases and deaths to 1,182 and 35, respectively.

26 April – 91 cases and 5 deaths reported, bringing the total number of confirmed cases and deaths to 1,273 and 40, respectively.

27 April – 64 cases and no deaths reported, bringing the total number of confirmed cases to 1,337.

28 April – 195 cases and 4 deaths reported, bringing the total number of confirmed cases and deaths to 1,532 and 44, respectively.

29 April – 196 cases and 7 deaths reported, bringing the total number of confirmed cases and deaths to 1,728 and 51, respectively.

30 April – 204 cases and 7 deaths reported, bringing the total number of confirmed cases and deaths to 1,932 and 58, respectively.

May

1 May – 238 cases and 10 deaths reported, bringing the total number of confirmed cases and deaths to 2,170 and 68, respectively.

2 May – 220 cases and 17 deaths reported, bringing the total number of confirmed cases and deaths to 2,388 and 85, respectively.

3 May – 170 cases and 2 deaths reported, bringing the total number of confirmed cases and deaths to 2,558 and 87, respectively.

4 May – 245 cases and 6 deaths reported, bringing the total number of confirmed cases and deaths to 2,802 and 93, respectively.

5 May – 148 cases and 5 deaths reported, bringing the total number of confirmed cases and deaths to 2,950 and 98, respectively.

6 May – 195 cases and 5 deaths reported, bringing the total number of confirmed cases and deaths to 3,145 and 103, respectively.

7 May – 381 cases and 4 deaths reported, bringing the total number of confirmed cases and deaths to 3,526 and 107, respectively.

8 May 
386 cases and 10 deaths reported, bringing the total number of confirmed cases and deaths to 3,912 and 117, respectively.
Abia State government announced the relaxing of their lockdown from 11 May.

9 May – 239 cases and 9 deaths reported, bringing the total number of confirmed cases and deaths to 4,151 and 128, respectively.

10 May – 248 cases and 15 deaths reported, bringing the total number of confirmed cases and deaths to 4,399 and 143, respectively.

11 May – 242 cases and 7 deaths reported, bringing the total number of confirmed cases and deaths to 4,641 and 150, respectively.

12 May – 146 cases and 8 deaths reported, bringing the total number of confirmed cases and deaths to 4,787 and 158, respectively.

13 May – 184 cases and 6 deaths reported, bringing the total number of confirmed cases and deaths to 4,971 and 164, respectively.

14 May – 193 cases and 3 deaths reported, bringing the total number of confirmed cases and deaths to 5,162 and 167, respectively.

15 May – 288 cases and 4 deaths reported, bringing the total number of confirmed cases and deaths to 5,445 and 171, respectively.

16 May – 176 cases and 5 deaths reported, bringing the total number of confirmed cases and deaths to 5,621 and 176, respectively.

17 May – 338 cases and 6 deaths reported, bringing the total number of confirmed cases and deaths to 5,959 and 182, respectively.

18 May 
216 cases and 9 deaths reported, bringing the total number of confirmed cases and deaths to 6,175 and 191, respectively.
The federal government extended the locking down of Kano State for another two weeks, while also extending the nationwide curfew for another two weeks.

19 May – 226 cases and 1 death reported, bringing the total number of confirmed cases and deaths to 6,401 and 192, respectively.

20 May – 284 cases and 8 deaths reported, bringing the total number of confirmed cases and deaths to 6,677 and 200, respectively.

21 May – 339 cases and 11 deaths reported, bringing the total number of confirmed cases and deaths to 7,016 and 211, respectively.

22 May – 245 cases and 10 deaths reported, bringing the total number of confirmed cases and deaths to 7,261 and 221, respectively.

23 May – 265 cases and no deaths reported, bringing the total number of confirmed cases to 7,526.

24 May – 313 cases and 5 deaths reported, bringing the total number of confirmed cases and deaths to 7,839 and 226, respectively.

25 May – 229 cases and 7 deaths reported, bringing the total number of confirmed cases and deaths to 8,086 and 233, respectively.

26 May – 276 cases and 16 deaths reported, bringing the total number of confirmed cases and deaths to 8,344 and 249, respectively.

27 May – 389 cases and 5 deaths reported, bringing the total number of confirmed cases and deaths to 8,733 and 254, respectively. 

28 May – 182 cases and 5 deaths reported, bringing the total number of confirmed cases and deaths to 8,915 and 259, respectively.

29 May – 387 cases and 2 deaths reported, bringing the total number of confirmed cases and deaths to 9,302 and 261, respectively.

30 May – 553 cases and 12 deaths reported, bringing the total number of confirmed cases and deaths to 9,855 and 273, respectively.

31 May – 307 cases and 14 deaths reported, bringing the total number of confirmed cases and deaths to 10,162 and 287, respectively.

June

1 June 
416 cases and 12 deaths reported, bringing the total number of confirmed cases and deaths to 10,578 and 299, respectively.
The federal government relaxed the lockdown imposed on Kano State and the ban placed on religious gatherings and banking operations for a period of four weeks, while also announcing the re-opening of domestic airline operations from 21 June. 
The federal government shortened the curfew from 10 pm to 4 am.

2 June – 241 cases and 15 deaths reported, bringing the total number of confirmed cases and deaths to 10,819 and 314, respectively.

3 June – 348 cases and 1 death reported, bringing the total number of confirmed cases and deaths to 11,166 and 315, respectively.

4 June – 350 cases and 8 deaths reported, bringing the total number of confirmed cases and deaths to 11,516 and 323, respectively.

5 June – 328 cases and 10 deaths reported, bringing the total number of confirmed cases and deaths to 11,844 and 333, respectively.

6 June – 389 cases and 9 deaths reported, bringing the total number of confirmed cases and deaths to 12,233 and 342, respectively.

7 June – 260 cases and 12 deaths reported, bringing the total number of confirmed cases and deaths to 12,486 and 354, respectively.

8 June – 315 cases and 7 deaths reported, bringing the total number of confirmed cases and deaths to 12,801 and 361, respectively.

9 June – 663 cases and 4 deaths reported, bringing the total number of confirmed cases and deaths to 13,464 and 365, respectively.

10 June – 409 cases and 17 deaths reported, bringing the total number of confirmed cases and deaths to 13,873 and 382, respectively.

11 June – 681 cases and 5 deaths reported, bringing the total number of confirmed cases and deaths to 14,554 and 387, respectively.

12 June – 627 cases and 12 deaths reported, bringing the total number of confirmed cases and deaths to 15,181 and 399, respectively.

13 June – 501 cases and 8 deaths reported, bringing the total number of confirmed cases and deaths to 15,682 and 407, respectively.

14 June – 403 cases and 13 deaths reported, bringing the total number of confirmed cases and deaths to 16,085 and 420, respectively.

15 June – 573 cases and 4 deaths reported, bringing the total number of confirmed cases and deaths to 16,658 and 424, respectively.

16 June – 490 cases and 31 deaths reported, bringing the total number of confirmed cases and deaths to 17,148 and 455, respectively.

17 June – 587 cases and 14 deaths reported, bringing the total number of confirmed cases and deaths to 17,735 and 469, respectively.

18 June – 745 cases and 6 deaths reported, bringing the total number of confirmed cases and deaths to 18,480 and 475, respectively.

19 June – 667 cases and 12 deaths reported, bringing the total number of confirmed cases and deaths to 19,147 and 487, respectively.

20 June – 661 cases and 19 deaths reported, bringing the total number of confirmed cases and deaths to 19,808 and 506, respectively.

21 June – 436 cases and 12 deaths reported, bringing the total number of confirmed cases and deaths to 20,244 and 518, respectively.

22 June – 675 cases and 7 deaths reported, bringing the total number of confirmed cases and deaths to 20,919 and 525, respectively.

23 June – 452 cases and 8 deaths reported, bringing the total number of confirmed cases and deaths to 21,371 and 533, respectively.

24 June – 649 cases and 9 deaths reported, bringing the total number of confirmed cases and deaths to 22,020 and 542, respectively.

25 June – 594 cases and 7 deaths reported, bringing the total number of confirmed cases and deaths to 22,614 and 549, respectively.

26 June – 684 cases and 5 deaths reported, bringing the total number of confirmed cases and deaths to 23,298 and 554, respectively.

27 June – 779 cases and 4 deaths reported, bringing the total number of confirmed cases and deaths to 24,077 and 558, respectively.

28 June – 490 cases and 7 deaths reported, bringing the total number of confirmed cases and deaths to 24,567 and 565, respectively.

29 June 
566 cases and 8 deaths reported, bringing the total number of confirmed cases and deaths to 25,133 and 573, respectively.
The federal government lifted the ban placed on inter-state travels and announced the re-opening of schools for only graduating students, effective from 1 July. 

30 June – 561 cases and 17 deaths reported, bringing the total number of confirmed cases and deaths to 25,694 and 590, respectively.

See also
Timeline of the COVID-19 pandemic in Nigeria (July–December 2020)
Timeline of the COVID-19 pandemic in Nigeria (January–June 2021)

References

Coronavirus pandemic
Disease outbreaks in Nigeria
Timelines of the COVID-19 pandemic in Nigeria